Karl Christian Erdmann of Württemberg-Oels (26 October 1716 in Wilhelminenort near Bernstadt – 14 December 1792 in Oels) was ruling duke of Württemberg-Oels and Bernstadt.

He was the only son of Christian Ulrich II, Duke of Württemberg-Wilhelminenort and his wife, Countess Philippine Charlotte of Redern-Krappitz.

In 1755 he was one of fourteen nobleman that founded the Order of Saint Joachim.

Marriage and issue
He married, in 1741, Countess Marie Sophie of Solms-Laubach (1721–1793). They had two children:
 Friederike Sophie Charlotte Auguste (1 August 1751 – 4 November 1789), who married Frederick Augustus, Prince of Brunswick-Wolfenbüttel-Oels.
 Friedrich Christian Karl (1757–1759), died in infancy.

References 

1716 births
1792 deaths
18th-century dukes of Württemberg